This article lists all bus routes, along with their branches, on the Toronto Transit Commission bus system. The list is current .

Route types

The Toronto Transit Commission operates five types of bus routes:
 Regular service routes have at least one branch or a section of overlapping branches that operates from 6 am (8 am on Sundays) to 1 am, 7 days per week. Some routes are part of the 10-Minute Network having one or more branches operating at a 10-minute frequency (or better) throughout the day and evening. Otherwise, service frequency varies by route and time of day.
 Limited service routes do not serve all hours of the day, or not all days of the week, or not all seasons. The frequency of service varies by route. Regular service and limited service routes are collectively numbered between 7 and 189.
 Blue Night Network routes (300-series) operate from 1 am to 6 am (8 am on Sundays), which are also the times that the Toronto subway system does not operate. Service frequency is 30 minutes or better depending on route.
 Community bus routes (400-series) operate Monday to Friday between the morning and afternoon peak periods, and connect senior citizen residences with local amenities within a community. Unlike for other routes, community bus routes use minibuses, and passengers may flag down the bus anywhere along route.
 Express Network routes (900-series) serve only select stops. The service frequency varies by route, and some routes do not operate during all periods. However, one express route (900 Airport Express) is also part of the 10-Minute Network.

All routes have wheelchair-accessible low-floor buses. Except for community routes, all buses are equipped with bicycle racks.

Routes

See also

Toronto Transit Commission bus system
Toronto streetcar system

References

External links
 

Toronto Transit Commission
Bus routes
Transit
Toronto